Incurvaria pectinea is a moth of the family Incurvariidae. It is found in Europe.

The wingspan is 12–16 mm. Head pale greyish-ochreous.Forewings shining prismatic fuscous ; a yellow-whitish dorsal spot before middle, and an indistinct dot before tornus. Hindwings brassy-grey. The moth flies from April to May depending on the location.

The larvae feed on various deciduous trees, such as birch, hazel and apple.

References

External links

Incurvaria pectinea at UKmoths
Lepidoptera of Belgium
Lepiforum.de
bladmineerders.nl 

Incurvariidae
Moths described in 1828
Moths of Europe
Taxa named by Adrian Hardy Haworth